Bill Baxter is a French group composed of Joe Cool (drums), Louis Primo (vocals) and Bo Gesture (bass). They are particularly known for their 1985 hit single "Embrasse-moi, idiot!".

History
The group signed with the Virgin label that published their first single "Petit avec des grandes oreilles" in 1982, then the mini-album La Belle vie (which contains seven songs) in 1983. In 1985, Bill Baxter recorded Embrasse-moi, idiot!, a musical produced by Patrick Timsit, inspired by Billy Wilder's film. The single of the same name was a success during the 1985 summer, reaching number 7 on the French SNEP Singles Chart. In 1987, the single "Bienvenue à Paris" was released, which was a duet with the londonian singer Tippa Irie. In the 1990s, the group decided to devote itself to the audio-visual for the TV program Les Guignols de l'Info, including "Reviens JPP reviens" and "La Combine à Nanard".

Laurent Ganem (aka Joe Cool) also composed the song "Plus rien n'est comme avant", published on Sylvie Vartan's album Sylvie. He is the president of the varieties commission of the SACEM.

Discography

Albums
 1986 : Embrasse-moi, idiot!

Singles
 1982 : "Petit avec des grandes oreilles"
 1985 : "Embrasse-moi, idiot" - #7 in France
 1986 : "Ding Dong"
 1986 : "L'Amour en capitale"
 1987 : "Bienvenue à Paris"

References

French pop music groups